Marko Torm (born 2 March 1980 in Kohtla-Järve) is an Estonian politician. He is a member of XIV Riigikogu and was Mayor of Rakvere from 2017 until 2019.

Since 2010, he is a member of Estonian Reform Party.

References

Living people
1980 births
Estonian Reform Party politicians
Members of the Riigikogu, 2019–2023
Mayors of places in Estonia
Tallinn University alumni
People from Kohtla-Järve